is a Japanese footballer currently playing for Nankatsu SC.

Career
After playing for several Japanese clubs and having featured also an A-League team, Kusukami opted for a loan period from Shimizu S-Pulse to Montedio Yamagata in July 2018.

Club statistics
.

References

External links
Profile at Nankatsu SC
Profile at Kawasaki Frontale

Living people
1987 births
Japanese expatriate footballers
Japanese footballers
Doshisha University alumni
Association football people from Shiga Prefecture
Association football midfielders
J1 League players
J2 League players
A-League Men players
Kawasaki Frontale players
Cerezo Osaka players
Sagan Tosu players
Western Sydney Wanderers FC players
Shimizu S-Pulse players
Montedio Yamagata players
Nankatsu SC players
Expatriate soccer players in Australia
Japanese expatriate sportspeople in Australia